The 1992 Deutsche Tourenwagen Meisterschaft was the ninth season of premier German touring car championship and also seventh season under the moniker of Deutsche Tourenwagen Meisterschaft. The season had twelve rounds with two races each; additional two rounds were held in Belgium and Czechoslovakia.

Teams and drivers

Schedule and results

Championship standings

External links
 DTM-Saison 1992 bei DTM.com
 Plakate der DTM-Rennen 1992

Deutsche Tourenwagen Masters seasons
1992 in German motorsport